First Microfinance Bank may refer to:

 First MicroFinance Bank-Afghanistan
 First MicroFinance Bank-Pakistan
 First MicroFinance Bank-Tajikistan